Penketh is a civil parish in the Borough of Warrington in Cheshire, England.  It contains six buildings that are recorded in the National Heritage List for England as designated listed buildings, all of which are at Grade II.   This grade is the lowest of the three gradings given to listed buildings and is applied to "buildings of national importance and special interest". The parish is mainly residential, with some farming,  The River Mersey runs through the parish, the Manchester Ship Canal runs along the southern boundary, and the A562 road ends within it.

References
Citations

Sources

Listed buildings in Warrington
Lists of listed buildings in Cheshire